The Health and Safety at Work Act 2015 is the principal piece of legislation defining the  statutory obligations of New Zealand business in relation to the safety and welfare of their employees. It shifts the focus from previous legislation which was principally about monitoring and recording incidents related to health and safety to a system where risks are identified and managed before they are able to affect the lives employees, customers and the general public.

A number of regulations have subsequently been created to implement the provisions of the act including Health and Safety at Work (Hazardous Substances) Regulations 2017.

The principal focus of responsibility and action throughout the legislation is the person conducting a business or undertaking (PCBU) rather than the corporate business entity.

References

Statutes of New Zealand
2015 in New Zealand law